Miss Universe 1956, the 5th Miss Universe pageant, was held on 20 July 1956 at the Long Beach Municipal Auditorium in Long Beach, California, United States. There were thirty contestants on stage. The nineteen-year-old Carol Morris was the second American representative (styled as "Miss USA") to win the contest. As was normal for the event, she was crowned by her immediate predecessor, Hillevi Rombin of Sweden.

Results

Placements

Contestants 

  Alaska - Barbara Maria Sellar
  – Ileana Carré
  - Lucienne Auquier
  - Maria José Cardoso
  - Rosalind Iva Joan Fung
  - Elaine Bishenden
  - Concepción Obach Chacana
  - Anabella Granados
  - Marcia Rodríguez
  - Olga Fiallo Oliva
  - Mercedes Flores Espín
  - Iris Alice Kathleen Waller
  - Anita Treyens
  - Marina Orschel
  - Rita Gouma
  - Ileana Garlinger Díaz
  - Rita Schmidt
  - Guðlaug Guðmundsdóttir
  - Sara Tal
  - Rossana Galli
  - Yoshie Baba
  - Erna Marta Bauman
  - Lola Sabogal
  - Isabel Escobar Rodriguez
  - Paquita Vivo
  - Ingrid Goude
  - Can Yusal
  - Titina Aguirre
  - Carol Morris
  - Blanca Heredia†

Notes

Debuts

Returns

Last competed in 1953:
 
Last competed in 1954:

Replacement
  - Edith Noble Nakpil was replaced by Isabel Escobar Rodriguez.

Withdrawals

 
 
  - Mirva Orvokki Arvinen

Awards
  - Miss Friendship (Anabella Granados)
  - Miss Photogenic (Marina Orschel)
  - Most Popular Girl (Carol Morris)

1956
1956 in California
1956 beauty pageants
Beauty pageants in the United States
July 1956 events in the United States